Al-Ahmadi Stadium is a multi-use stadium in Al-Ahmadi, Kuwait.  It is currently used mostly for football matches and is the home stadium of Al-Shabab.  The stadium holds 18,000 people.

External links
Stadium information

Football venues in Kuwait